Cambyretá (Guarani for Country of Milk) is a town and district in the Itapúa Department of Paraguay.

Notable people
Arnoldo Penzkofer, basketball player

Sources 
World Gazeteer: Paraguay – World-Gazetteer.com

Districts of Itapúa Department